The South Asian Games (SAF Games, SAG,  or SA games, and formerly known as South Asian Federation Games) are a biennial multi-sport event held among the athletes from South Asia. The governing body of these games is South Asian Sports Council (SASC), formed in 1983. At present, SAG are joined by eight members namely Afghanistan, Bangladesh, Bhutan, India, Maldives, Nepal, Pakistan, Sri Lanka.

South Asian Games

South Asian Beach Games

South Asian Winter Games

References

South Asian Games logos